Jorge Reyes Oregón (born January 23, 1991, in Acapulco, Guerrero, Mexico) is a Mexican former footballer who last played as a defender.

Club career
He was one of the young promising players of América that debuted in the Torneo Apertura 2011. He made his senior team debut on August 13, 2011, as a starter in a match against Tigres UANL in a 2–2 draw at the Estadio Universitario.

References

External links
 
 
 
 

Living people
1991 births
Club América footballers
C.D. Veracruz footballers
Club Atlético Zacatepec players
People from Acapulco
Footballers from Guerrero
Mexican footballers
Association football defenders